William Clarence Heatley (12 July 1920 – 29 October 1971) was an Australian politician.

Early life 
Born in Townsville, Queensland, Heatley was educated at All Souls School in Charters Towers.

After serving in the military 1940–1945, he became a grazier at Warwick and Miles, as well as a company director.

Politics 
On 14 April 1966, Heatley was appointed to the Australian Senate as a Liberal Senator for Queensland, filling the casual vacancy caused by the death of Liberal Senator Bob Sherrington. The Australian Constitution dictated that a special Senate election had to be held at the same time as the lower house election in 1966, in which Heatley easily defeated Labor candidate and future Senator Bertie Milliner. Heatley held the seat until his defeat in 1967, taking effect in 1968. In 1970 he entered the Legislative Assembly of Queensland as the member for Albert, but died in 1971.

Later life 
Heatley died on 29 October 1971 aged 51 at Surfers Paradise, Queensland.

References

1920 births
1971 deaths
People from Townsville
Liberal Party of Australia members of the Parliament of Australia
Members of the Australian Senate for Queensland
Members of the Australian Senate
People educated at All Souls School, Charters Towers
Liberal Party of Australia members of the Parliament of Queensland
20th-century Australian politicians